Slađan Ašanin (born 13 August 1971) is a Croatian former professional footballer who played as a defender for several clubs in Europe.

Club career
Born in Zagreb, Ašanin began his professional career with Inter Zaprešić. He spent two seasons with SK Slavia Praha in the Czech Gambrinus liga. In 1997, he won the Personality of the League award at the Czech Footballer of the Year awards. In 1998, he transferred to Borussia Mönchengladbach where he appeared in 150 Bundesliga matches.

References

1971 births
Living people
Footballers from Zagreb
Association football defenders
Croatian footballers
NK Inter Zaprešić players
SK Slavia Prague players
Borussia Mönchengladbach players
Rot Weiss Ahlen players
Croatian Football League players
Czech First League players
Bundesliga players
2. Bundesliga players
Croatian expatriate footballers
Expatriate footballers in the Czech Republic
Croatian expatriate sportspeople in the Czech Republic
Expatriate footballers in Germany
Croatian expatriate sportspeople in Germany